WDC may refer to:

Organizations
 The Walt Disney Company, an American media and entertainment company
 Western Design Center, a U.S. microprocessor company
 Western Digital Corporation (NASDAQ: WDC), an American disk drive manufacturer
 Whale and Dolphin Conservation, an international organisation with offices in the UK, North America, Germany and Australia
 World Dance Council
 World Darts Council, later Professional Darts Corporation

Other uses
 Washington, D.C., capital city of the United States of America
 World Data Center, for 1957–1958 International Geophysical Year data
 World Design Capital, a design award
World Drivers' Championship, award for the most successful Formula One driver in a season